Jason Earl Wiemer (born April 14, 1976) is a Canadian former professional ice hockey forward. He played for 11 seasons in the National Hockey League (NHL).

Playing career
Wiemer was drafted 12th overall in the 1991 WHL Bantam Draft by the Portland Winterhawks. While with the Portland, he was drafted 8th overall by the Tampa Bay Lightning in the 1994 NHL Entry Draft.

After starting his fourth season with the Winterhawks in 1994–95, Wiemer turned professional after 16 games and made his NHL debut with Tampa Bay. After playing in four seasons with the Lightning and struggling with the weight of offensive expectations due to his junior career, Weimer was traded at the deadline in the 1997–98 season to the Calgary Flames for Sandy McCarthy, a third round pick (Brad Richards) and a fifth round pick in the 1998 NHL Entry Draft on March 24, 1998.

Wiemer then played with the Flames for three seasons establishing himself as an effective enforcer and agitator due to his size, propensity for fighting and ability to deliver hits consistently.

Prior to the 2001–02 season, Wiemer was traded by the Flames, along with Valeri Bure, to the Florida Panthers for Rob Niedermayer on June 23, 2001. Jason recorded a career high 31 points in his lone season with Panthers before he was dealt to the New York Islanders for Branislav Mezei on July 3, 2002.

In 2003–04, his second season with the Islanders, Wiemer was claimed off waivers by the Minnesota Wild on November 13, 2003.

On August 5, 2004, Wiemer signed as a free agent with the Calgary Flames. On March 9, 2006, Wiemer was traded during the 2005–06 season from the Flames to the New Jersey Devils for a fourth round pick in the 2006 NHL Entry Draft. Reaching the playoffs for only the third time in his career, Weimer helped the Devils advance to the Conference Semifinals.

In early July, 2006, Wiemer underwent reconstructive knee surgery missing the entire 2006–07 season for the Devils. Wiemer has not played professional hockey since. He played 726 career NHL games, scoring 90 goals and 112 assists for 202 points and also compiled 1,420 penalty minutes.

Personal life
Wiemer married Lindsy Goodine in 2008. The couple has two children together.

Career statistics

References

External links
 

1976 births
Adirondack Red Wings players
Calgary Flames players
Canadian ice hockey centres
Florida Panthers players
Ice hockey people from British Columbia
Living people
Minnesota Wild players
National Hockey League first-round draft picks
New Jersey Devils players
New York Islanders players
Portland Winterhawks players
Tampa Bay Lightning draft picks
Tampa Bay Lightning players